Manuel "Manny" Sobral (born September 12, 1968) is the former Canadian and IBO Champion of the World, competing in the Super welterweight division. A resident of Vancouver, British Columbia, he represented Canada at the 1988 Summer Olympics in Seoul, South Korea, where he was eliminated by Olympic bronze medallist Finland's Joni Nyman on points (1:4).

He has taught at Burnaby North Secondary School.

External links

 Manny Sobral Biography and Olympic Results | Olympics at Sports-Reference.com
 Canadian Olympic Committee
 

1968 births
Living people
Canadian male boxers
Welterweight boxers
Boxers at the 1988 Summer Olympics
Olympic boxers of Canada
Sportspeople from Vancouver
Spanish emigrants to Canada
Spanish male boxers